Romário de Paula Ribeiro (born 6 September 1989) is a Brazilian football player who plays for Casa Pia.

Club career
He made his professional debut in the Primeira Liga for Belenenses on 3 April 2010 as a late substitute in a 0–0 draw against Paços de Ferreira. In his second, and, to date, last Primeira Liga game on 8 May 2010, he scored a goal in a 2–1 victory over Vitória de Setúbal.

References

1989 births
Sportspeople from Minas Gerais
Living people
Brazilian footballers
C.F. Os Belenenses players
Brazilian expatriate footballers
Expatriate footballers in Portugal
Primeira Liga players
G.D. Chaves players
Expatriate footballers in Spain
Esporte Clube Democrata players
Rio Branco Esporte Clube players
C.D. Fátima players
Casa Pia A.C. players
Cartagena FC players
Association football forwards
S.U. Sintrense players